The 2016 Colorado State Senate elections were held on November 8, 2016 to elect 18 of the 35 members of Colorado's Senate. The election coincided with elections for other offices, including U.S. President, U.S. Senate, U.S. House of Representatives and state senate. The primary election was held on June 28, 2016.

There was no change in the composition of the Senate as both Democrats and Republicans gained one seat each, winning 10 and 8 seats respectively.

Results

Statewide

District
Results of the 2016 Colorado Senate election by district:

Closest races 

  gain
 
  gain

References

Colorado Senate
Senate
2016